Nino Oliviero (13 February 1918 – 29 February 1980) was an Italian composer.

Born in Naples, Oliviero  began his career as composer after the Second World War, composing a series of successful Neapolitan melodies such as "'Nu quarto 'e luna" and "'O ciucciariello".  From Sixties he worked as musical editor of various newspapers and signed the soundtracks of a number of films, including Mondo Cane (1962), of which the theme song, "More", co-written with Riziero "Riz" Ortolani, was nominated for the Academy Award for Best Original Song at the 36th Academy Awards and became an international hit. He also scored the 1976 Vincente Minnelli musical A Matter of Time, which starred Liza Minnelli and Ingrid Bergman. Oliviero died in Rome, at 62, after a long illness.

Selected filmography
 Passionate Song (1953)
 The Daughter of the Regiment (1953)
 Men and Noblemen (1959)
 Run for Your Wife (1965)
 Savage Gringo (1966)
 A Matter of Time (1976)

References

External links
 
 

Italian film score composers
Italian male film score composers
Musicians from Naples
1918 births
1980 deaths
20th-century Italian composers
20th-century Italian male musicians